Masi-Manimba Territory is an administrative area of Kwilu province, Democratic Republic of the Congo. Its headquarters are in the town of Masi-Manimba, on the Lukula River, a tributary of the Kwilu River. The Luie and Kafi rivers also run from south to north through the territory, tributaries of the Lukula. 
The territory is divided into ten sectors: Bindungi, Kibolo, Kinzenga, Kinzenzengo, Kitoy, Masi-Manimba, Mokamo, Mosango, Pay-Kongila and Sungu.

References

Territories of Kwilu Province